Denzeil Boadu-Adjei (born 20 February 1997) is an English professional footballer who plays as a striker.

Early and personal life
Born in London, Boadu attended Central Foundation Boys' School in Islington. He is of Ghanaian descent.

Career
Boadu spent time with the youth teams of Tottenham Hotspur, Arsenal and Manchester City before joining German club Borussia Dortmund II in 2017. He returned to England with Crawley Town in September 2019. After four appearances he left the club by mutual consent in January 2020.

International career
Boadu has represented England at under-16 and under-17 level.

References

1997 births
Living people
English footballers
England youth international footballers
English people of Ghanaian descent
Tottenham Hotspur F.C. players
Arsenal F.C. players
Manchester City F.C. players
Borussia Dortmund II players
Crawley Town F.C. players
Regionalliga players
Association football forwards
English expatriate footballers
English expatriate sportspeople in Germany
Expatriate footballers in Germany